Joel Alexander Logan (born 25 January 1995) is an English professional footballer who plays as a midfielder.

Club career
After progressing through the Rochdale youth system he was promoted to the first team squad whilst still a youth team player. He made his professional debut on 20 October 2012, in a 3–1 defeat to Plymouth Argyle in League Two, coming on as a substitute for Peter Cavanagh.

On 27 March 2014, Logan joined Conference North side Stalybridge Celtic on loan until the end of the 2013–14 season.

On 1 August 2015, Logan joined Wrexham on loan for a month.

For the 2016–17 season he played for Guiseley.

In July 2017 he joined FC United of Manchester. He later signed a contract taking him through to May 2019 with the club.

In December 2018 he joined Hednesford Town on loan for a month. Ahead of the 2019–20 season, Logan joined Hyde United.

Career statistics

References

External links
 
 

1995 births
Living people
English footballers
Association football forwards
Footballers from Manchester
Rochdale A.F.C. players
Stalybridge Celtic F.C. players
Southport F.C. players
Wrexham A.F.C. players
English Football League players
Guiseley A.F.C. players
Halifax Town A.F.C. players
Hednesford Town F.C. players
F.C. United of Manchester players
Hyde United F.C. players